San Martín is a  department located in the centre of Mendoza Province in Argentina.

Name

The Department and its cabecera (capital) are named in honour of General San Martín (1778-1850), the military leader that led the Argentine forces to victory over the Spanish Empire during the Argentine War of Independence.

Districts

Alto Salvador
Alto Verde
Buen Orden
Chapanay
Chivilcoy, Mendoza
El Central
El Divisadero, Mendoza
El Espino
El Ramblón
Las Chimbas
Montecaseros
Nueva California
Palmira, Mendoza
San Martín
Tres Porteñas

Sport

The city of San Martín is home to Atlético Club San Martín, a football club currently playing in the regionalised 4th Division.

External links

Municipal Website (Spanish)
Viví San Martín (Spanish)
Atlético Club San Martín  (Spanish)

Departments of Mendoza Province
States and territories established in 1816